Oleg Borisovich Shevtsov (born November 29, 1971) is a Russian ice hockey player. He won a silver medal at the 1998 Winter Olympics.

External links

1971 births
Living people
Ice hockey players at the 1998 Winter Olympics
Olympic ice hockey players of Russia
Olympic silver medalists for Russia
Russian ice hockey goaltenders
Soviet ice hockey goaltenders
HC Spartak Moscow players
Severstal Cherepovets players
Lokomotiv Yaroslavl players
Avangard Omsk players
HC Dynamo Moscow players
HC Vityaz players
Olympic medalists in ice hockey
Medalists at the 1998 Winter Olympics
Ice hockey people from Moscow